Vullinghs can refer to
 Dick Vullinghs (born ca. 1936) Dutch aerospace engineer
 Henri Vullinghs (1883–1945) Dutch parson and resistance leader